The Australian Department of Education was a department of the Government of Australia charged with the responsibility for national policies and programs to help Australians access quality and affordable childcare; early childhood education, school education, post-school, higher education, international education and academic research. The head of the department was the Secretary of the Department of Education, Lisa Paul , who reported to the Minister for Education, the Hon Christopher Pyne , the Assistant Minister for Education, the Hon Sussan Ley , and the Parliamentary Secretary to the Minister for Education, Senator the Hon Scott Ryan.

History
The department was formed by way of an Administrative Arrangements Order issued on 18 September 2013 and replaced the functions previously performed by the Department of Education, Employment and Workplace Relations (DEEWR). DEEWR was formed in 2007 and absorbed the former Department of Education, Science and Training and the former Department of Employment and Workplace Relations.

The department was dissolved by way of an Administrative Arrangements Order issued on 23 December 2014 and superseded by the Department of Education and Training.

Operational activities

The functions of the department were broadly classified into the following matters:

Schools education policy and programs, including vocational education and training in schools, but excluding migrant adult education
Schooling transitions policy and programs including career pathways
Education and training transitions policy and programs
Youth affairs and programs, including youth transitions
Early childhood and childcare policy and programs
Co-ordination of early childhood development policy and responsibilities
Higher education policy, regulation and programs
Policy, coordination and support for international education

See also

 Minister for Education
 List of Australian Commonwealth Government entities
 Education in Australia

References

External links
 Department of Education website
 Australian Institute for Teaching and School Leadership Website

 
Australia, Education
2014 establishments in Australia
Public policy in Australia